Pueblo Deco is an architectural style in the Southwestern United States popular in the early 20th century. Pueblo Deco fused elements of Art Deco with the region's Pueblo and Territorial architectures, themselves inspired by Pueblo and Territorial Styles. Early Pueblo Deco design was influenced by architect Mary Colter's work, which incorporated Native American elements. The term was popularized by author Carla Breeze, whose 1984 Pueblo Deco: The Art Deco Architecture of the Southwest  (written with Marcus Whiffen) and 1990 Pueblo Deco books described the fusion of southwestern motifs with the popular Deco style. Notable examples of buildings incorporating Pueblo Deco elements include the KiMo Theater in Albuquerque, New Mexico and the Arizona Biltmore Hotel in Phoenix, Arizona.

Pueblo Revival style is associated with Art Deco's borrowing of non-Western stylistic elements, principally from Egyptian, Asian and in this case indigenous sources. The style emphasizes applied ornament, often in metalwork, together with extensive tilework and wall murals. Additional structures incorporating Pueblo Deco design include the El Navajo Hotel and the McKinley County Courthouse, both in Gallup, New Mexico.

Gallery

References

 
American architectural styles
Architecture in New Mexico
Architecture in Arizona
Revival architecture in the United States